Capital Airport primarily refers to Beijing Capital International Airport, serving Beijing, China.

Capital Airport may also refer to:
Abraham Lincoln Capital Airport, serving Springfield, Illinois, United States
Capital Region International Airport, serving Lansing, DeWitt Township, Michigan, United States
Cherry Capital Airport, serving Traverse City, Grand Traverse County, Michigan, United States
 Capital International Airport (Egypt), built to serve Egypt's New Administrative Capital

See also
Capital City Airport (disambiguation)